The Foca class were a group of three minelaying submarines built for the  (Royal Italian Navy) during the 1930s. All three sister ships played minor roles during the Second World War. One was lost to unknown causes while trying to lay a minefield off British Palestine in 1940, but the other two survived the war to be discarded in 1947.

Design and description
The Foca-class submarines were improved versions of the preceding Pietro Micca. They displaced  surfaced and  submerged. Their crew numbered 60 officers and men.

For surface running, the boats were powered by two  diesel engines, each driving one propeller shaft. When submerged each propeller was driven by a  electric motor. They could reach  on the surface and  underwater.

The boats were armed with six internal  torpedo tubes, four in the bow and two in the stern, for which they carried eight torpedoes. They were also armed with one  deck gun for combat on the surface. The gun was initially mounted in the rear of the conning tower, but this was re-sited on the forward deck later in the war in the surviving boats and the large conning tower was re-built to a smaller design. Their anti-aircraft armament consisted of two pairs of   machine guns. The Focas carried a total of 36 mines. Twenty mines were stored in a central chamber, while the remaining 16 mines were kept in two aft chutes through which the mines were ejected.

Boats

Service
The lead boat, Foca, was lost to unknown causeson 13 October 1940 while laying mines off Haifa. Atropo and Zoea, the second and third vessels of the class, were used after Italy's 1943 surrender by the Allies for anti-submarine training. Both were scrapped in 1947.

See also
 Italian submarines of World War II

Notes

References

External links
 Sommergibili Marina Militare website

Submarine classes
 
 Foca